Oxazoline is a five-membered heterocyclic organic compound with the formula . It is the parent of a family of compounds called oxazolines (emphasis on plural), which contain non-hydrogenic substituents on carbon and/or nitrogen. Oxazolines are the unsaturated analogues of oxazolidines, and they are isomeric with isoxazolines, where the N and O are directly bonded.  Two isomers of oxazoline are known, depending on the location of the double bond.

Oxazoline itself has no applications however oxazolines have been widely investigated for potential applications.  These applications include use as ligands in asymmetric catalysis, as protecting groups for carboxylic acids and increasingly as monomers for the production of polymers.

Isomers

Synthesis
The synthesis of 2-oxazoline rings is well established and in general proceeds via the cyclisation of a 2-amino alcohol (typically obtained by the reduction of an amino acid) with a suitable functional group. The overall mechanism is usually subject to Baldwin's rules.

From carboxylic acids 
The usual route to oxazolines entails reaction of acyl chlorides with 2-amino alcohols. Thionyl chloride is commonly used to generate the acid chloride in situ, care being taken to maintain anhydrous conditions, as oxazolines can be ring-opened by chloride if the imine becomes protonated. The reaction is typically performed at room temperature. If reagents milder than SOCl2 are required, oxalyl chloride can be used. Aminomethyl propanol is a popular precursor amino alcohol.

Modification of the Appel reaction allows for the synthesis of oxazoline rings. This method proceeds under relatively mild conditions, however, owing to the large amounts of triphenylphosphine oxide produced, is not ideal for large-scale reactions. The use of this method is becoming less common, due to carbon tetrachloride being restricted under the Montreal protocol.

From aldehydes 
The cyclisation of an amino alcohol and an aldehyde produces an intermediate oxazolidine which can be converted to an oxazoline by treatment with a halogen-based oxidising agent (e.g. NBS, or iodine); this potentially proceeds via an imidoyl halide. The method has been shown to be effective for a wide range of aromatic and aliphatic aldehydes however electron rich aromatic R groups, such as phenols, are unsuitable as they preferentially undergo rapid electrophilic aromatic halogenation with the oxidising agent.

From nitriles 
The use of catalytic amounts of ZnCl2 to generate oxazolines from nitriles was first described by Witte and Seeliger, and further developed by Bolm et al. The reaction requires high temperatures to succeed and is typically performed in refluxing chlorobenzene under anhydrous conditions. A precise reaction mechanism has never been proposed, although it is likely similar to the Pinner reaction; preceding via an intermediate amidine. Limited research has been done into identifying alternative solvents or catalysts for the reaction.

Applications

Ligands
Ligands containing a chiral 2-oxazoline ring are used in asymmetric catalysis due to their facile synthesis, wide range of forms and effectiveness for many types of catalytic transformation.

2-Substituted oxazolines possess a moderately hard N-donor. Chirality is easily incorporated by using 2-amino alcohols prepared by the reduction of amino acids; which are both optically pure and inexpensive. As the stereocentre in such oxazolines is adjacent to the coordinating N-atom, it can influence the selectivity of processes occurring at the metal centre. The ring is thermally stable and resistant to nucleophiles, bases, radicals, and weak acids as well as being fairly resistant to hydrolysis and oxidation; thus it can be expected to remain stable in a wide range of reaction conditions.

Major classes of oxazoline based ligand include:
 Bis-oxazolines (BOX)
 Phosphinooxazolines (PHOX) for example (S)-iPr-PHOX

Notable specialist oxazoline ligands include:

 Tris-oxazolines (TRISOX)
 Bis(oxazolinato)s
 Trisoxazolinylborate ligands

Polymers
Some 2-oxazolines, such as 2-ethyl-2-oxazoline, undergo living cationic ring-opening polymerisation to form poly(2-oxazoline)s. These are polyamides and can be regarded as analogues of peptides; they have numerous potential applications and have received particular attention for their biomedical uses.

Analysis of fatty acids
The dimethyloxazoline (DMOX) derivatives of fatty acids are amenable to analysis by gas chromatography.

See also 
Structural analogues
 Benzoxazole: where the oxazoline is fused onto a benzene ring.
 Oxazole: which has two double bonds
 Oxazolidine: which has no double bonds
 Thiazoline: where the oxygen is replaced by sulphur

Other pages
 Aminorex a drug bearing an oxazoline ring

References